William John Priestner (born August 4, 1958) is a Canadian football player who played professionally for the Hamilton Tiger-Cats.

References

1958 births
Living people
Hamilton Tiger-Cats players
Players of Canadian football from Ontario
Sportspeople from Burlington, Ontario